Garden of Eden Station, also known as Pickel's Station and McBride's Station, is a historic gas station located near Warrensburg, Johnson County, Missouri. It was built about 1928, and is a small, relatively unaltered rural gas station constructed of coursed sandstone blocks.

It was listed on the National Register of Historic Places in 1995.

References

Gas stations on the National Register of Historic Places in Missouri
Commercial buildings completed in 1928
Buildings and structures in Johnson County, Missouri
National Register of Historic Places in Johnson County, Missouri